Đỗ Văn Cầm, nom de guerre Hoàng Cầm (April 30, 1920 – August 19, 2013), was a Vietnamese general.

He was born in Cao Sơn, Ứng Hòa, Hà Đông. He led the 4th Corps (Vietnam People's Army) (NVA IV) against the South Vietnamese in the 1974 battle of Phuoc Long.

There is another by the name of Hoàng Cầm (1916–1996), who was a soldier inventor of the Viet Minh Hoàng Cầm stove.

References

1920 births
2013 deaths
Generals of the People's Army of Vietnam
Members of the 4th Central Committee of the Communist Party of Vietnam
Members of the 5th Central Committee of the Communist Party of Vietnam
Members of the 6th Central Committee of the Communist Party of Vietnam